Shalghami-ye Sofla (also Romanized as Shalghamī-ye Soflá; also known as Shalghamī-ye Pā’īn and Shalghami-ye Ḩājj Moḩammad) is a village in Pol Khatun Rural District, Marzdaran District, Sarakhs County, Razavi Khorasan Province, Iran. At the 2006 census, its population was 253, in 43 families.

References 

Populated places in Sarakhs County